The subsidiary protection in French asylum law is granted to an individual whom is exposed to a major threat in his or her home country without benefiting from the refugee status.

Criteria 
According to the Code of Entry and Residence of Foreigner and the Right of Asylum (CESEDA), the subsidiary protection is granted to persons whom are not eligible to the refugee status, and still, are under one of these major threats:

death penalty,
torture or other inhuman or degrading treatment or punishment,
 a direct and personal threat on one's life due to an armed conflict.

Procedure 
Since 2003, the subsidiary protection is given by the French Office for the Protection of Refugees and Stateless Persons, or OFPRA (Office français de protection des réfugiés et des apatrides). It can also be given by decision of the National Court for Right of Asylum or CNDA (Cour nationale du droit d'asile), which is the institution in charge of the instruction of legal appeal against OFPRA decisions. Both the OFPRA and the CNDA have to consider specifically and systematically the right to benefit from the subsidiary protection as soon as the asylum seeker does not fulfil the legal conditions to be recognized as a refugee (as defined by first article of the 28th of July 1951 Geneva convention).

When they benefit from the subsidiary protection, individuals are placed under the legal and administrative protection of the OFPRA. They will have a pluriannual resident card, limited to 4 years. During the whole period of their subsidiary protection, they can't go back to their country of origin.

References 

Right of asylum in France